Zugzwang is a situation found in chess and other games wherein one player is put at a disadvantage because they must make a move when they would prefer to pass and not move.

Zugzwang may also refer to:

 Zugzwang (musical work), a musical work by Juan Maria Solare
 "Zugzwang," an episode of the television series Extant (season 2)
 "Zugzwang," an episode of the television series Criminal Minds (season 8)
 "Zugzwang," an episode of the television series Lodge 49